Călugăreni is a commune located in Giurgiu County, Muntenia, Romania. It is composed of five villages: Brăniștari, Călugăreni, Crucea de Piatră, Hulubești and Uzunu.

The commune is famous for the Battle of Călugăreni, one of the most important battles in the history of mediaeval Romania.

Natives
 Nicolae Cartojan

References

Communes in Giurgiu County
Localities in Muntenia